Leon Ockenden (born 16 August 1978) is an English actor, director and writer who works in TV, film, theatre and radio. He grew up in the resort town of Looe, Cornwall. He is best known for his role as Norman Jayden in Heavy Rain.

Career
Ockenden left school at the age of 16 to become a baker. After working in hotel kitchens in Sweden and Germany for one year, he returned to Britain to work as a pastry chef at the Hilton Hotel on London's Park Lane. He studied performing arts at the College of Further Education in Plymouth.  He then received a scholarship from the London Academy of Music and Dramatic Art, where he took a three-year acting course and graduated in 2003.

Ockenden appeared in the British/Australian drama television series Tripping Over, playing a carpenter named Callum. He lent his voice and likeness to the 2010 video game Heavy Rain, in which he played Federal Bureau of Investigation profiler Norman Jayden. Before the show was cancelled in 2015, he was a regular of the British drama television series Waterloo Road, in which he played the role of Hector Reid, a jocular and sometimes vitriolic teacher of PE. After Waterloo Road, Ockenden has had other roles as a recurring cast member. One of these roles includes the character of Will Chatterton in the long-running soap opera Coronation Street. He has also joined the presenting team on the chat show This Morning as one of its regular chefs for its cooking segment.

He also appeared in a television advert for Verisure in 2021.

Personal life
Ockenden married actress Vanessa Hehir on 24 October 2010. They have a daughter.

Filmography

Films

Television

Video games

Music videos

Theatre
 How the Other Half Loves (2017)
 Flare Path (2015)
 Muswell Hill (2012)
 Plague Over England (2008)
 Women Beware Women (2006)
 The Tempest (2006)

References

External links
 

1978 births
21st-century English male actors
English male film actors
English male stage actors
English male soap opera actors
English male video game actors
Living people
People from Looe